Acta Biochimica et Biophysica Sinica (ABBS) is a peer-reviewed,  scientific journal, which publishes original research articles, short communications, and reviews in the fields of biochemistry and biophysics. Established in 1958, the journal is sponsored by the Institute of Biochemistry and Cell Biology, an institute of the Chinese Academy of Sciences, and is published monthly by Oxford Journals 
and was published by Blackwell Publishing prior to January 2009.

Abstracting and indexing
This journal is indexed in the following databases:
 Science Citation Index Expanded
 Zoological Record
 BIOSIS Previews
 Chemical Abstracts Service – CASSI
 Index medicus
 MEDLINE
 PubMed

Former title
Acta Biochimica et Biophysica Sinica was a Chinese-language journal entitled  "Shengwu Huaxue Yu Shengwu Wuli Xuebao" (see box below), which began publishing sometime in 1958 or 1959, or August 1961, until December 2003 (depending on the source). Tables of contents were in English. Summaries (abstracts) were in English and Russian, and text of articles in Chinese.  Later issues were promulgated in the  Chinese and English languages. The translated title was "Journal of Biochemistry and Biophysics".

The frequency was quarterly from 1959 to 1963, bimonthly from 1964 to 2002, and finally, monthly by 2003. Publication was suspended from 1966 to 1975. It was indexed in Chemical Abstracts Service. It may have published 35 volumes in total, over the years. In 2004 the journal switched to a full English-language journal under its current title.

References

External links

Institute of Biochemistry and Cell Biology, SIBS, CAS

Physics journals
Biochemistry journals
Publications established in 1958
Wiley-Blackwell academic journals